Pontiac is an unincorporated community in Butler County, Kansas, United States.

History
A post office was opened in Pontiac in 1873, and remained in operation until it was discontinued in 1926.

Education
The community is served by Flinthills USD 492 public school district.

References

Further reading

External links
 Butler County maps: Current, Historic, KDOT

Unincorporated communities in Butler County, Kansas
Unincorporated communities in Kansas